Mazen Khaled is a US based Lebanese director, Screenwriter, editor and producer. He is mostly known for his 2017 feature film Martyr which was screened at the 74th Venice International Film Festival and was nominated for the Queer Lion award. It was also selected for screening at the 2018 South by Southwest film festival in the Global section. Khaled also won the award for Best Artistic Achievement at the 2018 Alexandria International Film Festival for his work on Martyr. Khaled's 2010 short film My Queer Samsara (2010) premiered at the 2010 The International Film Festival Rotterdam. His other notable works as a director include A Petty Bourgeois Dream (2016), A Very Dangerous Man (2012), which was nominated for a Muhr Award at the Dubai International Film Festival, and Our Gentleman of the Wings (2010).

Life and career 

Khaled obtained a bachelor's degree in political studies from American University of Beirut. He then completed his master's degree in public policy from Georgetown University, Washington, D.C. He also attended a film production program at Concordia University and the screenwriting MFA program at Florida State University. He started his career as a policy analyst and project manager and consequently he moved to advertising niche where he wrote and directed numerous ad films for around 12 years. His early works included experimental films with emphasis on "16mm film and contemporary art video".  In 2002, he produced and directed his first short film Cadillac Blues.

He is also known as the co-founder of Beirut-based art collector organization EXIST.

Filmography

References

External links 

 
 Mazen Khaled at BFI
 Interview of Mazen Khaled by Filmmaker
Interview with Mazen Khaled by Angelo Acerbi for FRED Radio.

Living people
Lebanese film directors
Lebanese film producers
21st-century Lebanese writers
Year of birth missing (living people)
Writers from Beirut
Lebanese male writers